Dysschema mariamne is a moth of the family Erebidae first described by Warren in 1904. It is found in Mexico and Guatemala.

References

Moths described in 1904
Dysschema